Rhyparochromini is a tribe of dirt-colored seed bugs in the family Rhyparochromidae. There are more than 40 genera and 360 described species in Rhyparochromini. Rhyparochromini originates from Italy.

Genera
These 47 genera belong to the tribe Rhyparochromini:

 Acroraglius Wagner, 1961
 Aellopideus Seidenstucker, 1963
 Aellopus Wolff, 1802
 Altomarus Distant, 1903
 Beosus Amyot & Serville, 1843
 Callistonotus Horvath, 1906
 Caprochromus Scudder, 1968
 Caridops Bergroth, 1894
 Cordillonotus Scudder, 1984
 Cyrtocnemodon Eyles & Scudder, 1968
 Dieuches Dohrn, 1860
 Distadieuches Scudder, 1968
 Ectyphoscelus Eyles, 1968
 Elasmolomus Stal, 1872
 Graphoraglius Wagner, 1961
 Graptopeltus Stal, 1872
 Lanchnophorus Reuter, 1887
 Liolobus Reuter, 1885
 Metadieuches Distant, 1918
 Metochus Scott, 1874
 Microtomideus Reuter, 1885
 Naphiellus Scudder, 1962
 Naphius Stal, 1874
 Narbo Stal, 1865
 Naudarensia Distant, 1904
 Nocellochromus Scudder, 1963
 Orieotrechus Scudder, 1962
 Orphnotrechus Sweet, 1991
 Panaorus Kiritshenko, 1951
 Perimeda Reuter, 1887
 Peritrechus Fieber, 1861
 Phorcinus Stal, 1874
 Plinthurgus Kiritshenko, 1911
 Poeantius Stal, 1865
 Quiobbesus Scudder, 1968
 Ragliodes Reuter, 1885
 Raglius Stal, 1872
 Rhyparochromus Hahn, 1826
 Rhyparoclava Kment, Hemala & BaŇar, 2016
 Rhyparothesus Scudder, 1962
 Rollathemus Scudder, 1963
 Scudderocoris Dellapé, Melo, Montemayor & Kondorosy, 2017
 Stizocephalus Eyles, 1970
 Trichaphanus Kiritshenko, 1926
 Uhleriola Horvath, 1908
 Xanthochilus Stål, 1872
 † Prolygaeus Scudder, 1890

References

Further reading

External links

 

Rhyparochromidae
Articles created by Qbugbot